The Taub Urban Research Center is a research institution affiliated with New York University.  The Taub center aims to produce cutting-edge research in urban policy.  Research at the center has focused on national issues as well as those relating specifically to New York City.  Technology, economic development and immigration have been addressed in projects funded by the Taub center.

External links 
Taub website

New York University
Research institutes in New York (state)
Urban studies and planning schools